Select Music is an independent music and entertainment company in Australia.

History
Select Music opened its doors in 2005 by agents Stephen Wade & Rob G. The label includes a register of artists at the beginning of their career and ARIA award winning major acts, including Ball Park Music, Passenger and The Veronicas. In July 2019, Select Music appointed Jimmy Kleiner.

References

External links

Companies based in Sydney
2005 establishments in Australia
Music companies of Australia